Rex Critchlow (1936–2010) was an architect and industrial designer based in Lincolnshire

Life and career 
Born in Southampton the third son of William H Critchlow MBE, an Esso Oil executive, and Emily (née Leach), Critchlow was educated at Grosvenor House School in Harrogate, Worksop College and the University of Sheffield. After work in London for various practices including Eric Lyons, Critchlow moved to Lincolnshire in 1962 and  joined JFPye to form Pye & Partners (subsequently Pye Critchlow Architects) where he practiced until 2010.

Architectural works 

Offices and Canteen building at Easton, near Grantham for Christian Salvesen (1973–74)
Witham Hall, Witham-on-the-Hill – stable block conversion to music school
St Peter's Court, High St, Barton-upon-Humber (1981) – Civic Trust award for infill housing
Haven Mill, Grimsby – restoration & conversion of 5 storey Victorian mill to shops and restaurant with new footbridge over River Freshney
Own house at Barnoldby-le-Beck (1962–65)
House for Brian Clark, playwright in Derbyshire
House for author and journalist Philip Oakes & Gilly Hodson at North Owersby

Industrial design 
Mold-formed GRP bathroom pod, patented design acquired by Ideal Standard (1971)

References 

Architects from Lincolnshire
People educated at Worksop College
People associated with the University of Sheffield
1936 births
2010 deaths